These are the films shown at the 15th New York Underground Film Festival, held from April 2–8, 2008.

External links
 New York Underground Film Festival site
 2008 Festival Archive

New York Underground Film Festival
New York Underground Film Festival, 2008
New York Underground Film
2008 in New York City
2008 in American cinema